Ferodale is a sparsely populated rural suburb of the Port Stephens local government area in the Hunter Region of New South Wales, Australia. A large portion of the suburb is occupied by Grahamstown Dam, the lower Hunter Region's main water storage reservoir.

Geography 
Ferodale is immediately to the east of the Pacific Highway and to the north of Richardson Road, the main road between Raymond Terrace and Port Stephens. Although the suburb borders Raymond Terrace, residents of the suburb are closer to Medowie.

Notes

References

Suburbs of Port Stephens Council